"S.O.S" is a song by American pop group Jonas Brothers. The song was released as the second single from Jonas Brothers, their second studio album, in 2007. It was also their debut international single in Europe in May 2008 and in the United Kingdom in early June 2008.

Background and composition

In an interview with Elvis Costello, Nick said that "S.O.S" was one of the songs that came to him in the middle of the night. He wrote the song in only ten minutes. In a TikTok posted on the 15-year anniversary of the song, Nick further revealed that he wrote the song alone in a hotel room at thirteen years old. He also said that the original title was "A Call I'll Never Get", but when making the track list for the album, everyone kept calling it "S.O.S", so they ended up going with that title instead.

Chart performance
In August 2007, "S.O.S" debuted at number 65 on the Billboard Hot 100. In the week following its debut, the song rose to number 17 on the Billboard Hot 100, becoming the band's first single to reach the top 20.

The single sold very well digitally, having peaked at number four on Billboards Hot Digital Songs chart for two consecutive weeks in September 2007. It has sold 1.5 million copies in the US.

In Australia, "S.O.S" debuted inside the top 50 at number 48 on the ARIA Charts on April 13, 2008. It has thus far peaked at number 47.

On January 3, 2008, the single gained a dramatic rise from number 85 to number 40 increasing album sales in the past few weeks. The video was also premiered on Disney Channel Asia on February 13, 2008.

"S.O.S" premiered on the German charts for the week of June 17, 2008. It was the number 38 song in Germany.

In the UK, "S.O.S" was a moderate success, entering the UK Singles Chart at number 16 and rising the next week to number 13. However, despite large amounts of video airplay, it fell 11 places to number 24 the following week. In the fourth week on the UK Singles Chart, the single dropped another eight places to number 32. The song sold 2,000,000 copies worldwide becoming one of the best-selling songs of 2007. The song was later used as the B-side to "When You Look Me in the Eyes".

Music video
It premiered in early August on the Disney Channel. It also features a cameo by Moises Arias. The song is about having troubled relationships with girlfriends. In the video, Nick is seen waiting for his significant other at a restaurant table, who then arrives with two friends. He then walks off, annoyed that she was not alone. Kevin appears, walking, when he gets a text which states, "I like u...but I don't like u ):." He then throws the phone in a wastebasket. Joe approaches a girl who appears to be waving at him, but Moises Arias appears behind him and walks off with the girl instead. In the end, the brothers see three new girls and chase after them. These scenes are intercut with footage of the Jonas Brothers performing on the ship's deck in front of an electric sign that says 'S.O.S.' The video also debuted on MTV Live in August 2019.

Track listing
US and Europe maxi CD single
 "S.O.S" (Album Version) – 2:33
 "Hello Beautiful" (Live) – 3:22
 "Year 3000" (Album Version) – 3:21
 Music video "S.O.S" – 2:33

Charts

Weekly charts

Year-end charts

Release history

References

2007 singles
2007 songs
2008 singles
Hollywood Records singles
Jonas Brothers songs
Song recordings produced by John Fields (record producer)
Songs written by Nick Jonas